ROOP is a multiparadigm programming language targeted at AI applications created at the Chengdu University of China. It combines rule-based, procedural, logical and object-oriented programming techniques.

Features
 ROOP is directly built upon C++, providing full unrestricted access to all its features.
 ROOP, like OPS-83 and ORBS, is data-driven but, unlike those languages, rules in ROOP may enter into local communication and this can be used to dynamically divide them into groups, including the problem status space tree.
 Rules and facts in ROOP are objects, and they send and respond to messages just like any other object in the language. This capability is not typically available in other logical programming languages such as Prolog.
 ROOP's inference engine can be redefined by the programmer, something which is usually not feasible in other logical languages.

References
A Rule-based and Object-oriented AI Programming Language, Tao Li, ACM SIGPLAN Notices, Volume 30, No.12, December 1995

Multi-paradigm programming languages
Object-oriented programming languages
Logic programming languages